The Ventuari River is the largest tributary of the Orinoco in southern Venezuela. The Ventuari flows from south-central Venezuela in the Guiana Highlands southwest into the Orinoco River.

The river drains the Guayanan Highlands moist forests ecoregion. The Ventuari River is the largest clearwater tributary of the Orinoco. , 470 fish species were known from the river, including several endemics, and a few new species have been described from the river since then.

References

 Hitchcock, Charles B. La región Orinoco Ventuari. Relato de la Expedición Phelps al Cerro Yaví. Caracas: Ministerio de Educación Nacional, Imprenta El Compás, 1984 (Translated from an older English Edition: The Orinoco - Ventuari Region. American Geographical Society, 1947).
 Koch-Grünberg, Theodor. Vom Roraima zum Orinoco. 1917. Reissued by Cambridge University Press, 2009; .

Rivers of Venezuela
Orinoco basin